Ezekiel is a masculine Hebrew language name, meaning "God's Strength." It can be used as both a given name and a surname.

List of people
Notable people with the name include:

Given name
 Ezekiel (c. 622 – c. 570 BCE), Hebrew prophet of the Old Testament
 Ezekiel (Nestorian patriarch), patriarch of the Church of the East 570–581
 Ezekiel the Tragedian (2nd century BCE), author of Greek tragedies on biblical matters
 Ezekiel Ansah (born 1989), Ghanaian football player
 Ezekiel Bacon (1776–1870), American lawyer and politician from Massachusetts and New York
 Ezekiel S. Candler Jr. (1862–1944), American politician from Mississippi
 Ezekiel F. Chambers (1788–1867), American politician from Maryland
 Ezekiel Elliott (born 1995), American football player
 Ezekiel Abraham Ezekiel (1757–1806), English engraver
 Ezekiel C. Gathings (1903–1979), American politician from Arkansas
 Ezekiel Hart (1767–1843), British North America entrepreneur and politician
 Ezekiel B. Hart (c. 1795–1814), American naval officer
 Ezekiel Henty (born 1993), Nigerian footballer
 Ezekiel Kemboi (born 1982), Kenyan athlete
 Ezekiel Maige (born 1970), Tanzanian politician
 Zeke Moreno (born 1978), American football player
 Zeke Mowatt (born 1961), American football player

Surname
 Ezekiel Abraham Ezekiel (1757–1806), English engraver
 Florence Ezekiel (1932–2006), known as Nadira, Indian actress
 Imoh Ezekiel (born 1993), Nigerian football player
 Judah bar Ezekiel (220–299 CE), Babylonian amora
 Mordecai Ezekiel (1899–1974), American economist
 Moses Jacob Ezekiel (1844–1917), American sculptor
 Nissim Ezekiel (1924–2004), Indian poet, playwright, and art critic
 Sarah Ezekiel (born 1965), artist diagnosed with ALS

Stage name
 Ezekiel Jackson (b. 1978), ring name of professional wrestler Rycklon Stephens, best known for competing in WWE
Ezekiel (b. 1987), ring name of professional wrestler Jeffrey Sciullo, currently signed to WWE and best known as Elias

Fictional characters
 Ezekiel (comics), a character from Marvel's Spider-Man comics
 Ezekiel, a fallen angel from the TV series Supernatural
 Ezekiel Bloor, a character in Jenny Nimmo's Children of the Red King
 Ezekiel Cheever, a character in Arthur Miller's play The Crucible
 Ezekiel Rage, an overzealous antagonist from The Real Adventures of Jonny Quest
 Ezekiel "Zeke" Stane, a character from Marvel's Iron Man comics
 Ezekiel Zick from the Monster Allergy comic book and TV series
 King Ezekiel, a character in The Walking Dead franchise
 Ezekiel, a character from the Total Drama series
 Ezekiel Figuero, the protagonist of The Get Down
 Ezekiel Jones, a main character on the television series The Librarians, portrayed by John Harlan Kim
 Ezekiel “Easy” Boudreau, lawyer and one of the main characters in the television series Proven Innocent, portrayed by Russell Hornsby
 Ezekiel “EZ” Reyes, main character in the television series Mayans M.C., portrayed by J. D. Pardo
 Ezekiel Pedrad, "Zeke" character in book series "Divergent"
 Ezekiel Abaddon "the Despoiler", Warmaster of Chaos in Warhammer 40,000

See also
 Ezekiel (disambiguation)
 Yehezkel (name)

Hebrew masculine given names
Hebrew-language surnames
Masculine given names
Theophoric names
English masculine given names
Modern names of Hebrew origin